Nan Baker (born December 3, 1954) is a Republican politician. Formerly, she represented the 16th district as a member of the Ohio House of Representatives from 2009 to 2016.

Life and career
Baker was a member of the Westlake City Council, and she has been a member of the Westlake Board of Education. Baker is a small business owner.

Baker earned an AA in business; a BA from Baldwin Wallace College; and is a graduate of the leadership academy at the Maxine Goodman Levin College of Urban Affairs at Cleveland State University, where she was awarded the David C. Sweet distinguished alumni award in 2006. She is married and has 3 children.

Ohio House of Representatives
On November 4, 2008, Baker won election to the Ohio House of Representatives, defeating incumbent Jennifer Brady. A businesswoman, she was elected in 2008 with 50.9% of the vote and was re-elected in 2010. She won two more terms in 2012 and 2014 before being term limited in 2016.

References

External links
Reelect Nan Baker, official campaign site

Living people
Cleveland State University alumni
Baldwin Wallace University alumni
People from Westlake, Ohio
1954 births
21st-century American politicians
Women state legislators in Ohio
Ohio city council members
School board members in Ohio
Republican Party members of the Ohio House of Representatives
Women city councillors in Ohio
21st-century American women politicians
Cuyahoga County Council members